Sex and a Girl (also known as Alex in Wonder) is a 2001 American comedy and drama film directed by Drew Ann Rosenberg. The film starring Angela Gots, Robert Hays, Ellen Greene, Sean Flynn, Danny Masterson and Alison Lohman in the lead roles.

Cast
 Angela Gots
 Robert Hays
 Ellen Greene
 Sean Flynn
 Danny Masterson
 Alison Lohman
 Soleil Moon Frye
 Lisa Brenner
 Geneviève Bujold
 Mary Kay Wulf
 Tom Wright
 Ivo Cutzarida
 Ryan Freeman
 John Walcutt

References

External links
 

2001 films
2001 comedy-drama films
Films shot in California
2001 comedy films
2001 drama films
American comedy-drama films
2000s English-language films
2000s American films